Stanley Milton Siegel (October 2, 1936 – January 2, 2016) was a radio reporter, newscaster and iconoclastic talk show host, whose The Stanley Siegel Show aired live on New York's WABC from 1975 to 1980.

Career
Siegel's interviews challenged his guests, which included transgender tennis player Renée Richards, U.S. senator Henry M. Jackson, authors Gloria Steinem, Truman Capote, Norman Mailer, LSD advocate Timothy Leary, bodybuilder and stripper Kellie Everts, and actress Marlo Thomas. Siegel's other programs included America Talks Back on Lifetime and the travel show Stanley on the Go for RLTV.

References

1936 births
2016 deaths
American radio reporters and correspondents
American talk radio hosts